The name Trix has been used to name nine tropical cyclones in the northwestern Pacific Ocean.

Typhoon Trix (1952)
Typhoon Trix (1957)
Typhoon Trix (1960)
Typhoon Trix (1963)
Typhoon Trix (1965)
Tropical Storm Trix (1968)
Typhoon Trix (1971)
Tropical Storm Trix (1974)
Typhoon Trix (1978)

Pacific typhoon set index articles